Benjamin Holme House also known as "Holmeland" is located in Elsinboro Township in Salem, Salem County, New Jersey, United States. The house was built in 1729 and was added to the National Register of Historic Places on August 31, 1978. The original property expanded over 1,600 acres, with a ferry running to New Castle, DE. The house was looted and burned by the British during The American Revolution, and was later rebuilt, adding the East section of the house in the 1780s.

See also
National Register of Historic Places listings in Salem County, New Jersey

References

Houses on the National Register of Historic Places in New Jersey
Houses completed in 1729
Houses in Salem County, New Jersey
National Register of Historic Places in Salem County, New Jersey
Salem, New Jersey
New Jersey Register of Historic Places
1729 establishments in New Jersey